Lanzhou BRT is a bus rapid transit system in Lanzhou, China. The buses are supplied by Youngman. Flat fare is 2 yuan. Six conventional bus lines also use parts of the BRT network.

The system was partially inspired by the Guangzhou Bus Rapid Transit system.

Split stations
Lanzhou BRT is the first BRT system to use split stations. Several of the platforms are located in the middle of the road, and buses in both directions stop cross-platform. This saves platform space. However, it requires the buses to be fitted with doors on both sides. Passenger access the platforms through overpasses or underground pedestrian tunnels.

Route B1

See also
 List of bus rapid transit systems

References

External links

 Lanzhou BRT on World BRT
 Lanzhou BRT on Urban Transport Photo Library
 Video of the BRT route

Bus rapid transit in China
Transport in Lanzhou